Shikari, also known as Shikari: The Hunter in India and Po Zakonu Dzhungley (По закону джунглей, The Law of the Jungle) in the USSR, is a 1991 film, jointly directed by Umesh Mehra and Latif Faiziyev, mostly shot in Russia, starring Mithun Chakraborty, Irina Kushnareva, Varsha Usgaonkar, Naseeruddin Shah, and Amrish Puri.

It would be the third and last film where India and the USSR collaborated, though the latter would dissolute the same year.

Plot
Shikari is the story of Shankar (Mithun Chakraborty), who earns his living by doing road shows along with Chanchal. Shankar happens to see a circus poster featuring Natasha (Irina Kushnareva) and begins to dream of working with her. By chance Shankar receives an offer to work in a Russian circus troupe where Natasha is also employed.

Cast
 Naseeruddin Shah as Adarsh Kumar / Fakira
 Mithun Chakraborty as Shankar Kumar
 Irina Kushnareva as Natasha
 Varsha Usgaonkar as Chanchal
 Vinod Mehra as Chanchal's Father
 Gulshan Grover as Bob
 Amrish Puri as Nahar Singh
 Dara Singh as Bajrangi
 Anjana Mumtaz as Mrs. Bajrangi
 Amrit Pal as Hari Singh
 Achyut Potdar as Raja Sahib
 Rucha Gujrati as Young Chanchal
 Ali Asgar as Young Adarsh/Fakira
 Master Bunty as Young Shankar
 Makhmud Ismilov as Makhham

Soundtrack

The music was composed by Anu Malik and the lyrics were written by Anand Bakshi.

References

External links
 

1991 films
1990s Hindi-language films
Films scored by Anu Malik
Films shot in Russia
Indian multilingual films
Soviet multilingual films
1990s Russian-language films
Films directed by Umesh Mehra
Indian action films